Heriberto Herrera Udrizar (24 April 1926 – 26 July 1996) was a footballer and manager who played international football for both Paraguay and Spain as a defender.

Career
Herrera played for Club Nacional of Paraguay and for several Spanish teams. While playing for the Paraguay national football team he led the team to win the 1953 Copa América against Brazil and was named the best player of the tournament. He later played one game for the Spain national football team in 1957.

As a coach, he managed Spanish teams (Elche CF and Valencia CF among them) and Italian teams Juventus and Inter Milan.

He coached Juventus from 1964 to 1969, winning one scudetto in the 1966–67 season and one Coppa Italia in the 1964–65 season. Herrera ranks fourth in most games as a Juventus coach with 162 (Giovanni Trapattoni is first with 402 games).

As the coach of Internazionale, he led the team to a second-place finish in the 1969–70 Serie A season.

Biography
Herrera was born in Guarambaré. He died in Asunción in 1996.

Honours

Player
Paraguay
Copa América: 1953

Manager
Juventus
Serie A: 1966–67
Coppa Italia: 1964–65

See also
List of Spain international footballers born outside Spain

References

External links
Heriberto Herrera coaching stats at Juventus
Fútbol en la Red profile

1926 births
1996 deaths
People from Guarambaré
Paraguayan footballers
Spanish footballers
Paraguayan expatriate sportspeople in Spain
Paraguay international footballers
Spain international footballers
Dual internationalists (football)
Club Nacional footballers
Paraguayan football managers
Spanish football managers
La Liga players
Atlético Madrid footballers
Serie A managers
Juventus F.C. managers
Inter Milan managers
La Liga managers
Rayo Vallecano managers
CD Tenerife managers
Granada CF managers
Real Valladolid managers
RCD Espanyol managers
Elche CF managers
UD Las Palmas managers
Valencia CF managers
Expatriate football managers in Italy
Paraguayan expatriate sportspeople in Italy
Expatriate football managers in Spain
Association football defenders